Guttridge is a surname. Notable people with the surname include:

Bill Guttridge (1931–2013), English footballer and manager
Darcy Guttridge (born 1999), Australian rules footballer
Frank Guttridge (1866–1918), English cricketer and footballer
Leonard Guttridge (1918–2009), English historian and author
Luke Guttridge (born 1982), English footballer
Peter Guttridge, English writer

See also

Gutteridge